The 2019–20 NCAA Division II men's ice hockey season began on November 1, 2019 and concluded on March 7 of the following year. This was the 38th season of second-tier college ice hockey.

Regular season

Standings

See also
 2019–20 NCAA Division I men's ice hockey season
 2019–20 NCAA Division III men's ice hockey season

References

External links

 
NCAA